Manouchehr Tabib (born November 21, 1982), known professionally as Kheiron, is an Iranian-born French comedian, actor and film director. Internationally, he is best known as the director and star of All Three of Us which was nominated for the César Award for Best First Feature Film. His subsequent film Bad Seeds (French title: Mauvaises Herbes) was released in English-speaking countries through Netflix.

Filmography

Actor

Filmmaker

References

External links 

1982 births
Living people
French male comedians
French male film actors
French film directors
French people of Iranian descent